The New Juaben South constituency is in the Eastern region of Ghana. It was created prior to the 2004 Ghanaian general election. The current member of Parliament for the constituency is Michael Okyere Baafi of the New Patriotic Party. He was first elected in the 2020 Ghanaian general election.

Members of Parliament

Michael Okyere Baafi was elected on the ticket of the New Patriotic Party (NPP) in the 2020 Ghanaian general election where he won by a majority of 
47,862. He succeeded Mark Assibey-Yeboah who had represented the constituency in the 4th Republican parliament on the ticket of the New Patriotic Party (NPP).

See also
List of Ghana Parliament constituencies

References

Parliamentary constituencies in the Eastern Region (Ghana)